The Scharoun Ensemble is a German chamber music group, consisting of members of the Berliner Philharmoniker. The repertoire ranges from baroque to contemporary music.

Background and history
The Scharoun Ensemble Berlin was founded in 1983 by members of the Berliner Philharmoniker. The group made its public debut with Schubert's Octet in F major D. 803. The ensemble is named after architect Hans Scharoun, designer of the Berliner Philharmonie. The permanent core of the ensemble is a standard octet comprising clarinet, horn, bassoon, two violins, viola, cello and double bass. Since 2005, the annually Zermatt Festival is organized by and around the Scharoun Ensemble.

Members
 Alexander Bader, clarinet
 Markus Weidmann, bassoon
 Stefan de Leval Jezierski, horn (co-founder)
 Wolfram Brandl, violin
 Rachel Schmidt, violin
 Christophe Horak, violin
 Micha Afkham, viola
 Richard Duven, cello
 Peter Riegelbauer, double bass (co-founder)

Awards
 2012 International Classical Music Awards (Chamber Music) for Beethoven: Septet op. 20, Sextet op. 71. Tudor 2011

Discography
 Schubert: Octet D. 803. Tudor, 2002
 Mozart, Brahms: Clarinet Quintets. With Karl-Heinz Steffens. Tudor, 2007
 Frank Martin: Le vin herbé. With Daniel Reuss, RIAS Chamber Choir. Harmonia Mundi, 2007
 Beethoven: Septet op. 20, Sextet op. 71. Tudor, 2011
 Dvořák: Bagatelles Op. 47, Terzetto Op. 74, String Quintet Op. 77. Tudor, 2015
 Hans Werner Henze: Kammermusik 1958 "In lieblicher Bläue", Neue Volkslieder und Hirtengesänge. With Andrew Staples, Markus Weidmann, Jürgen Ruck, Daniel Harding. Tudor, 2017

References

External links 
 
 Berlin Philharmonic page about the group

Musical groups from Berlin
Chamber music groups
Berlin Philharmonic
Musical groups established in 1983